The Lindenwood Lions men's ice hockey team represents the Lindenwood University in NCAA Division I ice hockey. The program had won four club National Championships prior to its promotion to varsity status.

History
 Lindenwood founded its men's program as a club team in 2003. From its inception, the Lions performed well on the ice, winning 25 out of 29 games in its first year. As the team's schedule increased in difficult, head coach Derek Schaub was able to keep the program in good standing and got the Lions to post a 30-win season 2008. That season saw the team reach the championship game but it was only the beginning for the Lions. The following year Lindenwood was a juggernaut, going 42–4 and winning their first championship while outscoring opponents 313 to 77. After a second dominating championship in 2010, Schaub stepped down and turned the team over to assistant coach and former NHL player, Rick Zombo.

Under Zombo's leadership the Lions continued to be a national contender, reaching the championship in his first season and eventually winning their third title in 2016. While the men's team was achieving those heights, they were overshadowed by the women's team, which had won three consecutive ACHA championships and been promoted to Division I in 2011. In 2021 the school announced its plan to have the men's team finally follow the Lady Lions into the varsity ranks and the program began to transition in that direction.

While the school did not officially state that the team would be a Division I program in 2022, multiple news reports indicate the program was on track to secure the needed funding. Critically, the COVID-19 pandemic did not appear to have hampered plans for the program's promotion. Furthering the potential viability of the team is its current home, the Centene Community Ice Center. With a seating capacity of 2,500, the building is comparable to other Division I programs, particularly for a school that only boasts a student body of approximately 7,500.

In the 2021 offseason, the team also began seeing its first transfers into the program from Division I programs (Kyle Jeffers), demonstrating the confidence that some have in Lindenwood's progress. Lindenwood's promotion made the Lions the first Division I program in the St. Louis area since Saint Louis University discontinued their program in 1979.

On March 23, 2022, Lindenwood officially announced that its men's ice hockey team would join Division I in the fall. The team finished its final club season with a 22–3 record and won their fourth ACHA National Championship.

Lindenwood will be eligible for postseason participation in 2026–27, its first full season of D-I membership.

Season-by-season results

Coaches
Rick Zombo was retained as the team's head coach when it transitioned to Division I status in 2022.

As of the completion of 2022–23 season

Roster
As of August 16, 2022.

|}

Statistical leaders

Career points leaders

Career goaltending leaders

GP = Games played; Min = Minutes played; W = Wins; L = Losses; T = Ties; GA = Goals against; SO = Shutouts; SV% = Save percentage; GAA = Goals against average

minimum 900 minutes played

Statistics current through the start of the 2023-24 season.

Lions in professional hockey
Daniel Walcott, NHL, defenceman/forward currently playing for the Tampa Bay Lightning organization.

References

External links
Official Home Page

 
Ice hockey teams in Missouri